Wentworth Dillon, 4th Earl of Roscommon (1637–1685), was an Anglo-Irish landlord, Irish peer, and poet.

Birth and origins 
Wentworth was born in October 1637 in Dublin, probably in St George's Lane. He was the only son of James Dillon, 3rd Earl of Roscommon, and Elizabeth Wentworth. His father was the 3nd Earl of Roscommon. He had conformed to the established church. Wentworth's mother was English, a sister of Thomas Wentworth, Earl of Strafford, who was therefore his uncle. Strafford was viceroy at the time of Wentworth's birth.

Early life 

As a young child he was educated by a tutor at Wentworth Woodhouse, his uncle Thomas's family seat in South Yorkshire. Later he was sent to Caen in Normandy, where a Calvinist academy or university existed at that time and where Wentworth is supposed to have been taught by Samuel Bochart. 

His father died accidentally in Limerick in 1649: according to family tradition Wentworth, who was at Caen at the time, exclaimed "My father is dead!" at the moment it happened, two weeks before the news could have reached him. He therefore succeeded his father has the 4th Earl of Roscommon.

Roscommon then travelled in Italy and studied at Rome. He returned from Italy to London at the Restoration. He was well received at court.

Marriages 
Roscommon married twice. Both marriages were childless.

In April 1662 he married Frances, widow of Colonel Francis Courtenay, 3rd Baronet (died 1660), and daughter of Richard Boyle, 1st Earl of Burlington, who was also 2nd Earl of Cork.

On 10 November 1674 he married Isabella Boynton. She outlived him and died in 1721.

Career 
In 1649 he had succeeded to the Earldom of Roscommon, which had been created in 1622 for his great-grandfather, James Dillon; and he was now put in possession by an act of the Irish Parliament of all the lands possessed by his family before the Civil War. As Captain of the Gentlemen Pensioners he found abundant opportunity to indulge the love of gambling, which appears to have been his only vice. He fought a number of duels, but unlike his uncle Carey, later the 5th Earl, he is not known to have killed any of his opponents. Disputes with Lord Robartes, the Lord Privy Seal, about his Irish estates necessitated his presence in Ireland, where he gave proof of some eloquence in debate, and of some business capacity. On his return to London, he was made Master of the Horse to the Duchess of York.

His reputation as a didactic writer and critic rests on his blank verse translation of Horace's Ars Poetica (1680) and his Essay on Translated Verse (1684). The essay contained the first definite enunciation of the principles of poetic diction, which were to be fully developed in the reign of Queen Anne. Roscommon, who was fastidious in his notions of dignified writing, was himself a very correct writer, and quite free from the indecencies of his contemporaries. Alexander Pope, who seems to have learnt something from his carefully balanced phrases and the regular cadence of his verse, says that "In all Charles's days, Roscommon only boasts unspotted bays"; in his An Essay on Criticism, when Pope lists poets he admires, beginning from the classical age, Roscommon is one of two British poets he includes (William Walsh is the other).

Roscommon believed that a low code of morals was necessarily followed by a corresponding degradation in literature, and he insists that sincerity and sympathy with the subject in hand are essential qualities in the poet. This elevated conception of his art is in itself no small merit. He has, moreover, the distinction of having been the first critic to avow his admiration for Milton's Paradise Lost. Roscommon formed a small literary society that he hoped to develop into an academy with authority to formulate rules on language and style, but its influence only extended to a limited circle, although it included such men of distinction as John Dryden and George Savile, 1st Marquess of Halifax, the scheme fell through after its promoter's death.

Death, succession, and timeline 
Roscommon died on 18 January 1685 in his house at St James, Westminster and was buried in Westminster Abbey. The title passed to his uncle, Carey Dillon, 5th Earl of Roscommon (1627–1689), the "Colonel Dillon" of the Diary of Samuel Pepys. In 1746, on the death of James, the 8th earl, it passed to Robert Dillon (died 1770), a descendant of the first earl. His family became extinct in 1816, and in 1828 Michael James Robert Dillon, another descendant of the 1st Earl, established his right to the earldom before the House of Lords. When he died in May 1850, the title became extinct.

Works 
Horace’s Art of Poetry (1680).
Traitté touchant l'obéissance passive (1686).

Roscommon's poems were collected in 1701, and are included in Robert Anderson's and other collections of British poets.

Notes and references

Notes

Citations

Sources 

 
 
  – Marriages, baptisms and burials from about 1660 to 1875
 
 
  – N to R (for Roscommon)
 
 
  – (for timeline)
 
 
 
  – Viscounts
  – 1 January 1660 to 30 March 1660/1

External links 

 

 

1637 births
1685 deaths
17th-century English poets
17th-century Irish writers
17th-century male writers
Earls of Roscommon
English male poets
Honourable Corps of Gentlemen at Arms
Irish poets
Members of the Privy Council of Ireland